William Lovette Holtzclaw (born May 12, 1964) is an American Republican politician. He has served as a member of the Alabama State Senate from the 2nd District from November 6, 2010, to November 7, 2018.

Early life
William Lovette Holtzclaw was born on May 12, 1964, in Elaine, Arkansas. He attended Jonesboro High School in Jonesboro, Arkansas. He graduated from Athens State University, where he received a Bachelor of Science. He served in the United States Marine Corps from 1983 to 2003.

Career
Holtzclaw served in the U.S. Marine Corps until 2003. He served in the Operation Desert Storm in Iraq in 1991 and later in the Operation Restore Hope in Mogadishu, Somalia in 1992–1993. He also served by working at the Marine Corps Ammunition School at Redstone Arsenal near Huntsville, Alabama. In 2006, he worked for Wachovia Securities.

In 2010, Holtzclaw was elected to the 2nd district of the Alabama State Senate and reelected for a second term in 2014.

Personal life
Holtzclaw is married to Pam, his high school sweetheart, and they have two children. They live in Madison, Alabama and attend Asbury United Methodist Church.

References

External links
 
 Bill Holtzclaw at Alabama Legislature

1964 births
Living people
United States Marine Corps personnel of the Gulf War
People from Phillips County, Arkansas
People from Madison, Alabama
Military personnel from Alabama
United States Marines
Republican Party Alabama state senators
Athens State University alumni
21st-century American politicians